Dual is a 2022 American satirical science fiction thriller film written, directed, and produced by Riley Stearns. It stars Karen Gillan, Beulah Koale, Theo James, and Aaron Paul. The plot follows a woman who has to fight a clone of herself to the death after she unexpectedly recovers from a terminal illness. The film premiered at the 2022 Sundance Film Festival on January 22, 2022. It was released in the United States on April 15, 2022, by RLJE Films.

Plot
In the near future, Sarah is a depressed alcoholic in a lackluster relationship with her boyfriend Peter and generally disconnected from her pestering mother. One day, Sarah awakens to find a pool of blood in her bed and later learns she is terminally ill, and is told that she will die with certainty. The doctor admits to a 2% margin of error, but insists that Sarah's death is certain. To save those she cares about from the pain of losing her, Sarah opts for a cloning procedure of herself to take her place.

Sarah dubs her clone "Sarah's Double" and gives her the basic knowledge of her interests and lifestyle. Ten months later, Sarah is informed that she has, inexplicably, gone into full remission, and that she is going to live. When she arrives at her mother's house to share the good news, she finds Peter and Sarah's Double there and is furious to discover that Sarah's Double had been in contact with her mother for quite some time, against her wishes. The truth now exposed, Sarah tries to return things to normal and demands her clone to be "decommissioned", only to be rejected by Peter, as well as her mother, both of whom prefer the clone.

Sarah is told that Sarah's Double has requested to stay alive, meaning that, by law, they will have to participate in a publicized duel to the death in a year that they must prepare for. Having to pay for her clone as well as herself, Sarah soon takes up self-defense and combat classes with a trainer, Trent. For the next year, Sarah improves herself both physically and mentally, learning to tolerate violence, and how clone duels operate. In lieu of payment for the final month of training, she teaches Trent hip-hop dancing. Feeling confident, Sarah meets up with Peter to state that she means no ill will but promises to unapologetically kill her clone.

While in the middle of a test with Trent, Sarah spots her clone watching from outside and chases her to a nearby playground. There, they talk over their situation before Sarah's Double takes Sarah to a support group for people who survived their duels. Outside, the two bond and agree to escape past the border to live their lives. The next morning, the two hike through a forest where Sarah discovers that Sarah's Double has poisoned her water.

Sarah's Double eventually shows up late to the duel alone, lying that she is the original and stating that the "clone" has fled. After an investigation and a court hearing, a judge declares her to be the original, freeing her to take over as the only Sarah. However, Sarah's Double is soon left feeling just as depressed and unfulfilled as the original Sarah, carrying her burdens such as the unfiltered Peter and her doting mother (who both know she is the clone). While out driving, Sarah's Double stops in the middle of a roundabout and cries.

Cast

 Karen Gillan as Sarah / Sarah's Double
 Aaron Paul as Trent
 Theo James as Robert Michaels
 Beulah Koale as Peter
 Ali Asghar Shah as Robin
 Maija Paunio as Sarah's Mother
 Sanna-June Hyde as Doctor
 Andrei Alén as Facility Tech
 Kris Gummerus as Tom

Production
The film was announced in April 2020, with Karen Gillan, Aaron Paul, Beulah Koale and Jesse Eisenberg cast. Principal photography began in October 2020. The film was shot entirely in Tampere, Finland, and is also co-financed by IPR.VC, the Finnish venture capital company. Due to the COVID-19 pandemic in America, the film crew tried to find a suitable location in Canada and New Zealand, but to no avail, so Finland was chosen as the shooting location for the film. The filming took six weeks, and during that time, Karen Gillan embarked on a heavy fitness workout for her role guided by local coaches.

With the successful filming, the City of Tampere and Film Tampere signed an agreement with XYZ Films for other future productions of the company. The idea of organizing an international short film competition called Generation XYZ for the 2021 Tampere Film Festival arose from the same collaboration.

Release
The film premiered at the 2022 Sundance Film Festival on January 22, 2022. In Finland, in which the film was completely filmed, it premiered at the Tampere Film Festival on March 12, 2022. RLJE Films acquired the film's distribution rights afterwards. It was released in the United States on April 15, 2022. In April 2022, RLJE Films signed an output deal with AMC+. The film was released on the streaming service on May 20, 2022.

Reception

Box office
In the United States and Canada, the film earned $118,254 from 157 theaters in its opening weekend.

Critical response
The film received positive reviews from critics.  

Peter Debruge at Variety wrote, "Dual is in fact a fairly astute comedy. The laughs come not from jokes so much as sharp jabs of truth — wince-inducing insights into the subjects most movies won't touch, like our fear of death, intimacy and being forgotten." IndieWires David Ehrlich said the film "isn't too big on world-building (lo-fi technology does much of the heavy lifting here, with slide projectors and squelching dial tones co-existing alongside damningly realistic internet porn), but it sure is huge on training sequences. ... Dual reliably gets close to unlocking that layer during its most juvenile moments, as Stearns finds a kind of Beavis and Butt-Head-level poetry in the sort of things that are too immature for other films like this to touch." Writing for The Hollywood Reporter, John DeFore said "the problematic-clone theme is familiar enough that it alone won't keep many viewers engaged for 90 minutes, though Stearns does find an intriguing third-act complication or two. Gillan, who has spent much of her post-Doctor Who decade playing cyborgs, computer avatars and a thinly imagined assassin, has a barely more human role to play here; to the extent that she makes either Sarah worth rooting for, it's an achievement."

References

External links
 
 
 
 
 

American science fiction thriller films
2022 independent films
Films about cloning
Films shot in Finland
Tampere
Films impacted by the COVID-19 pandemic
2020s English-language films
Films directed by Riley Stearns
2020s American films